Arkle Beck is the stream running through the valley of Arkengarthdale in the Yorkshire Dales, England. It is a tributary of the River Swale, which it joins just past Reeth at Grinton Bridge. The beck itself has several tributaries which include:
Great Punchard Gill
William's Gill
Annaside Beck
Roe Beck

In 1986, a section of the meadow alongside Arkle Beck at Whaw was designated as a site of special scientific interest (SSSI).

References

Rivers of North Yorkshire
Arkengarthdale